Asteropyrum is a genus of flowering plants belonging to the family Ranunculaceae.

Its native range is Eastern Himalaya to China.

Species:

Asteropyrum cavaleriei 
Asteropyrum peltatum

References

Ranunculaceae
Ranunculaceae genera